The American Composites Manufacturers Association (ACMA) is the world's largest trade association serving the composites industry. Its mission is to provide education and information to the composites industry, lobby for the composites industry, and develop and expand markets for composite materials.

Government affairs

ACMA's government affairs department assists member companies in keeping up to date on current regulations.  The government affairs department is also responsible for advocating on behalf of member companies when new legislation is being formed.

Political action committee

ACMA has operated its own political action committee since 2003.  ACMA PAC supports members of Congress who agree with ACMA's views on issues affecting the composites industry.

Caucus

ACMA coordinates the Congressional Composites Caucus in an effort to encourage members of Congress to learn more about the composites industry.  The caucus currently has 32 members and hosts 3–4 briefings annually to inform Congressmen and their staff on the applications of composite materials.  Caucus participation is achieved by ACMA member companies sending letters to their Congressman requesting that they join the caucus.

Certification

An important part of ACMA's mandate is to certify composites employees. This is done through the ACMA Certified Composites Technician (CCT) training and exam.  There are eight separate CCT programs focusing on different technical aspects of the composites industry.

COMPOSITES conference

ACMA organizes a convention each year called COMPOSITES.  The purpose of the convention is to educate manufacturers on emerging technologies in the composites industry and allow them to connect with buyers as well as suppliers.

Composites Manufacturing Magazine

ACMA writes and publishes a magazine for the composites industry called Composites Manufacturing.  This is a bimonthly publication with different market segments for aerospace, architecture, automotive, energy, infrastructure, marine, military, sports/recreation and university R&D.  The magazine keeps readers informed about the most recent developments in the composites industry.

Scholarship

The Western Chapter Scholarship is a scholarship for employees, spouses, and children of employees of companies in the states of Alaska, Arizona, California, Colorado, Hawaii, Idaho, Montana, New Mexico, Nevada, Oregon, Utah, Washington, and Wyoming who are ACMA members.

References

External links
 ACMA Website
 Certified Composites Technician Program
 Composites Manufacturing

Trade associations based in the United States